Kyllinga nemoralis, the white water sedge or whitehead spikesedge, is a plant species in the sedge family, Cyperaceae. It is found in shaded meadows, rock crevices and road sides.

Description
Kyllinga nemoralis is a perennial creeping sedge spreading by means of a long-creeping rhizome, found in shaded meadows, rock crevices and road sides. Stems erect, up to 55 cm in height, 3-angled; single flower.

References

nemoralis
Plants described in 1775